Igling is a municipality in the district of Landsberg in Bavaria in Germany.

Subdivisions
The municipality Igling consists of the subdivisions (Ortsteile) Holzhausen, Unterigling and Oberigling.

Population development

In 1970 1,656 were residing in Igling, in 1987 1,767 people lived in Igling, and 2005 2,125 residents lived in Igling.

History

Igling belonged to the barons of Donnersberg. The village was part of the Electorate of Bavaria and formed a "geschlossenes Hofmark" which place of residence Oberigling has been. In the course of administrative reform in Bavaria accrued through the Gemeindeedikt today's municipal. 
During the second world war many areas were dispossessed. The castle was confiscated by the SS and happened to be the field office of the Landsberger jail after the war. Until 1945 the Lager II der Außenlagergruppe Landsberg/Kaufering of the concentration camp Dachau existed there. Afterward fugitives were accommodated in the castle.

The train station on the rail route Munich-Memmingen has been closed.

Politics

Mayor of Igling is Christl Weinmüller.

Culture and sights

 The Castle of Igling, privately owned, with castle restaurant and golf course.
 Parish Church John the Baptist, baroque church
 Brewery in Holzhausen with beer garden
 Iglinger Sommerkeller, disco and bar
 2 concentration camp cemeteries

Education

In 1999 the following institutions existed:
 Kindergarten: 71 kids
 Elementary school: 1 with 8 teachers and 303 pupils

References

External links
  European Holocaust Memorial - a monument ensemble against racism and totalitarianism at the place of the crime - under the executive management of the Citizens´ Association European Holocaust Memorial Foundation
 The Holocaust in the Landsberg area- Citizens´ Association "Landsberg in the 20th Century" (English) 

Landsberg (district)